Zhang Weida (born 18 September 1949) is a Chinese FIDE Master chess player.

He was a member of the Chinese national chess team. He was part of the national team at the Chess Olympiad twice in 1978 and 1982. He played a total of 11 games, scoring 5 wins, 3 draws and 3 losses.

As of 2004, Zhang was the deputy head coach of the national chess team.

China Chess League
Zhang Weida played for Shanghai and Zhejiang chess clubs in the China Chess League (CCL).

See also
Chess in China

References

External links

1949 births
Living people
Chinese chess players
Chess coaches
Chess FIDE Masters